Alberada of Buonalbergo was a duchess of Apulia as the first wife of Robert Guiscard, duke of Apulia (1059–1085).

She married Guiscard in 1051 or 1052, when he was still just a robber baron in Calabria. As her dowry, she brought Robert Guiscard 200 knights under command of her nephew Girard of Buonalbergo. She had two children with Guiscard: a daughter, Emma, mother of Tancred, Prince of Galilee, and a son, Prince Bohemond I of Antioch. In 1058, after Pope Nicholas II strengthened existing canon law against consanguinity and on that basis, Guiscard repudiated Alberada in favour of a then-more advantageous marriage to Sichelgaita, the sister of Prince Gisulf II of Salerno. Nevertheless, the split was amicable and Alberada showed no later ill will.

She was alive at the death of Bohemond in March 1111 and died very old, probably in July 1122 or thereabouts. She was buried near the Hauteville family mausoleum in the Abbey of Holy Trinity at Venosa. Her tomb is the only one remaining intact today.

References

Sources
Norwich, John Julius. The Normans in the South 1016-1130. Longmans: London, 1967.

1030s births
1122 deaths
Italo-Normans
People from the Province of Benevento
11th-century Italian women
Hauteville family
Burials at the Abbey of Santissima Trinità, Venosa